Orpecovalva acantha is a moth of the family Autostichidae. It is found on Sardinia.

References

Moths described in 1963
Orpecovalva
Moths of Europe